Lynda Boudreau (born March 9, 1952) is an American politician in the state of Minnesota. She served in the Minnesota House of Representatives.

References

Women state legislators in Minnesota
Republican Party members of the Minnesota House of Representatives
1952 births
Living people
People from Faribault, Minnesota
21st-century American women